John Edward Green (October 12, 1937 – April 24, 2019) was an American collegiate and professional football quarterback who played four American Football League seasons from 1960 to 1963 for the Buffalo Bills and the New York Titans and one season in the CFL with the Toronto Argonauts.

See also
 Other American Football League players

References

1937 births
2019 deaths
People from West Point, Mississippi
Players of American football from Mississippi
American football quarterbacks
Canadian football quarterbacks
American players of Canadian football
Chattanooga Mocs football players
Buffalo Bills players
New York Titans (AFL) players
Toronto Argonauts players
American Football League players